William H. Quarles  (1869 – March 25, 1897) was a pitcher in Major League Baseball for the 1891 Washington Statesmen and 1893 Boston Beaneaters.

External links

Major League Baseball pitchers
Washington Statesmen players
Boston Beaneaters players
Baseball players from Virginia
1869 births
1897 deaths
19th-century baseball players
Winston-Salem Blue Sluggers players
Columbia Senators players
Savannah Electrics players
Savannah Rabbits players
Wilkes-Barre Coal Barons players
Hazleton Quay-kers players
Pottsville Colts players
Scranton Coal Heavers players
Petersburg Farmers players
Hampton Clamdiggers players
Portsmouth Browns players
Sportspeople from Petersburg, Virginia